Laziji is a dish of Sichuan cuisine. It is a stir-fried dish, which consists of marinated then deep-fried pieces of chicken, dried Sichuan chilli peppers, spicy bean paste, Sichuan peppers, garlic, and ginger.

Toasted sesame seeds and sliced spring onions are often used to garnish the dish. Diners use chopsticks to pick out the pieces of chicken, leaving the chilies in the bowl.

Laziji originated near Geleshan in Chongqing, where restaurateurs used small free-range chickens from nearby farms. This poultry became a signature export for Geleshan.

See also
 List of chicken dishes
 Kung Pao chicken

References

Chinese chicken dishes
Sichuan cuisine
Deep fried foods
Chili pepper dishes
Spicy foods